Mord, lilla vän is a 1955 Swedish drama film directed by and starring Stig Olin.

Cast
 Stig Olin as Dick Mattsson
 Inga Landgré as Brita Ljungdahl
 Gösta Cederlund as Herman Rooth
 Peter Lindgren as Valter Smitt
 Torsten Lilliecrona as Rune Gordon
 Ingvar Kjellson as Erik Ljungdahl
 Curt Masreliez as Klas Gillnader
 Mimi Pollak as Olga Vaern
 Hans Strååt as Martin Eriksson
 Inga Gill as Mrs. Nygren
 Bengt Eklund as Pierre Olovsson
 Nils Kihlberg as Jan Kristensson
 Ulf Johanson as Olle Sivert

References

External links
 

1955 films
1955 drama films
Swedish drama films
1950s Swedish-language films
Swedish black-and-white films
1950s Swedish films